Devotion is the second studio album by American musician Margaret Glaspy. It was released on March 27, 2020 under ATO Records.

Critical reception

Devotion was met with generally favorable reviews from critics. At Metacritic, which assigns a weighted average rating out of 100 to reviews from mainstream publications, this release received an average score of 72, based on 6 reviews. BBC Radio 6 Music declared Devotion one of the twenty essential albums released in the first six months of 2020.

Track listing

References

2020 albums
ATO Records albums